Vlad Andrei Danale (born 28 January 1998) is a Romanian professional footballer who plays as a forward for Dante Botoșani.

Honours
Aerostar Bacău
Liga III: 2019–20

References

External links
 
 

1998 births
Living people
Sportspeople from Iași
Romanian footballers
Association football midfielders
Liga I players
Liga II players
Liga III players
FC Politehnica Iași (2010) players
CS Aerostar Bacău players